Chico is a town in Wise County, Texas, United States. The population was 946 in 2020.

Geography

Chico is located at  (33.296056, –97.798605).

Demographics

As of the 2020 United States census, there were 946 people, 338 households, and 258 families residing in the city.

Education
The city of Chico is served by the Chico Independent School District.

References

Cities in Texas
Cities in Wise County, Texas
Dallas–Fort Worth metroplex